The men's points race was an event at the 1984 Summer Olympics in Los Angeles, California, for which the final was held on August 3, 1984. There were 43 participants from 25 nations (with 6 other cyclists not starting). Each nation was limited to 2 cyclists. 24 cyclists competed in the final after two semifinals (twelve best in each qualified). The event was won by Roger Ilegems of Belgium, with Uwe Messerschmidt taking silver and José Youshimatz of Mexico bronze. It was the first medal in the event for each nation, none of which had competed in the previous edition in 1900 (though a united Germany had competed and taken a medal).

Background
This was the second appearance of the event. It was first held in 1900 and not again until 1984; after that, it was held every Summer Games until 2008 when it was removed from the programme. The women's version was held from 1996 through 2008.

The reigning World Champion (1983) was Michael Markussen of Denmark. The other two men from the world championship podium, Hans-Joachim Pohl of East Germany and Ivan Romanov of the Soviet Union, were not able to compete due to the Soviet-led boycott.

23 nations made their debut in the event. France and Italy competed for the second time, the only nations to have competed in 1900 as well as 1984.

Competition format
The contest consisted of two rounds: semifinals and a final. The distance varied by round, with 30 kilometres in the semifinals and 50 kilometres in the final. The top 12 in each of the two semifinals advanced to the 24-man final. Placement in each race was determined first by how many laps behind the leader the cyclist was and second by how many sprint points the cyclist accumulated. That is, a cyclist with more sprint points but who was lapped once would be ranked behind a cyclist with fewer points but who had not been lapped. Sprint points could be gained only by cyclists who had not been lapped.

In the semifinals, there were 20 sprints—one every 1.5 kilometres. Points were awarded based on the position of the cyclists at the end of the sprint. Most of the sprints were worth 5 points for the leader, 3 to the second-place cyclist, 2 to third, and 1 to fourth. The 10th (halfway) and 20th (final) sprint were worth double: 10 points, 6, 4, and 2.

The final featured 30 sprints—one every 1.67 kilometres. As in the semifinals, most sprints were worth 5/3/2/1 points, with the halfway (15th) and final (30th) sprints worth 10/6/4/2.

Schedule
All times are Pacific Daylight Time (UTC-7)

Results

Semifinals

Semifinal 1

Semifinal 2

Final
The final classification was as follows:

Results summary

References

External links
 Official Report

Cycling at the 1984 Summer Olympics
Cycling at the Summer Olympics – Men's points race
Track cycling at the 1984 Summer Olympics